Perbrinckia fido is a species of decapod in the family Gecarcinucidae.

The IUCN conservation status of Perbrinckia fido is "CR", critically endangered. The species faces an extremely high risk of extinction in the immediate future.

References

Further reading

 

Gecarcinucidae
Articles created by Qbugbot
Crustaceans described in 2001